Robert Bauer (born Phillip Bauer, sometimes credited as "Bobby Bauer") is an American actor, producer, screenwriter, and director. He is best known for playing Moke in Rob Reiner's movies This Is Spinal Tap (1984) and The Sure Thing (1985), Johnny Horne in Twin Peaks, Jordan in Flying Blind, Roland Sachs in 54 (1998), Hook in Sabrina, the Teenage Witch, and Kunivas - a male Klingon officer - in Star Trek: The Next Generation. He is also known for his producing work on films like Waitress (2007), the TV series Head Case, and the web series Dinner with Don.

He played Moke, the band's roadie, in Rob Reiner's movie This Is Spinal Tap (1984) and later played the same role in another Reiner movie the following year, The Sure Thing (1985). He also played Lambsblood in A Spinal Tap Reunion: The 25th Anniversary London Sell-Out (1992).

He is one of three actors to portray the character of Johnny Horne, the mentally-challenged son of Benjamin Horne and brother of Audrey Horne, in Twin Peaks. He was the second actor, replacing Robert Davenport, who played the character in the Pilot. Bauer portrayed Johnny in the most episodes and is probably the best known for the role, appearing in four episodes of the original series over the course of the first and second seasons. He was replaced by Erik Rondell in the revival.

He played Roland Sachs in 54 (1998). Other film roles include Nicholas in A Time to Remember (2003), Dirk in Dirk and Betty (2000) (which he co-directed with Paul Gordon), Mr. Clarence in Intrepid (2000), Breeze in Boogie Boy (1998), Ben in Something to Live for: The Alison Gertz Story (aka Fatal Love), and roles in Father of the Bride (1991), Parker Kane (TVM 1990), and The Big Picture (1989).

Television series roles include Jordan in Flying Blind, Hook in Sabrina, the Teenage Witch, Leo in an episode of Party of Five, Eddie Stokes in an episode of M.A.N.T.I.S., and Kunivas, a male Klingon officer in the Klingon Defense Force in the 24th century in the episode "Heart of Glory" of Star Trek: The Next Generation.

Other television roles include NYPD Blue, The Lot, In Living Color, Quantum Leap, Father Dowling Investigates, and more.

He is an accomplished drummer and was in a band called "The Watch" with actor Michael Dorn (who played bass). They also guest-starred together in Star Trek: The Next Generation.

He is also known for his producing credits, which include Dinner with Don (2017), Waitress (2007), Head Case, and more. He co-created Bauerbrook Films with actor, friend, and Twin Peaks co-star Dana Ashbrook.

Filmography

Film

Television

References

External links
 

21st-century American male actors
American film producers
American male television actors
American male film actors
American television producers
Year of birth missing (living people)
Living people